Lycée Nelson Mandela ("Lycée Louis Armand" until 2015), is a senior high school in Poitiers, France.

Its inauguration took place in September 2015.

Location 
Lycée Nelson Mandela is located rue de la Bugellerie.

High school ranking 
The school is ranked 1327th in the national ranking (France).

References

External links 

 Lycée Nelson Mandela (Poitiers)

Secondary schools in France
2015 establishments in France